José Fernando Tielve Asensao (born 21 July 1986) is a Spanish actor, known for his performances in films such as The Devil's Backbone and The Shanghai Spell and the  television series El internado.

Biography 
José Fernando Tielve Asensao was born on 21 July 1986 in Madrid, developing an interest in acting at a young age. At age 13, he was cast for the lead role of the young boy Carlos (10-year-old) in the Guillermo del Toro's film The Devil's Backbone, making his feature film debut. His performance earned him a award to Best Young Actor in an International Film at the Young Artist Awards in 2002. He also starred in Fernando Trueba's The Shanghai Spell next to Aida Folch and Juanjo Ballesta.

He was cast as Cayetano en the television series El internado, playing the role between 2007 and 2008 for 22 episodes. Yet following the onscreen death of the character (the first corresponding to a protagonist), and Tielve's subsequent exit from the series, his visibility in Spain faded substantially. He featured in a minor role in Rage (produced by Del Toro) as the grandson of the character played by Concha Velasco. He starred in the 2009 British film Unmade Beds as Axl, a transplant from Spain, and as the title character in the 2010 indie film  opposite to Margo Stilley.

Filmography 

Film

Television

References 

Spanish film actors
Spanish television actors
Spanish male child actors
21st-century Spanish male actors

1986 births

Living people